Bonin is a surname. Notable people with the surname include:

Anatoliy Bonin (1915-1981), Soviet soldier during World War II, Hero of the Soviet Union
Celeste Bonin (born 1986), professional wrestler currently working under the ring name "Kaitlyn"
Charlotte Bonin (born 1987), Italian professional triathlete
Gordie Bonin (1948–2013), Canadian drag racer
Grzegorz Bonin, Polish footballer, midfielder, right winger, dribbler and long-distance-striker
Marcel Bonin (born 1931), Canadian ice hockey player
Paul Bonin (born 1960), English songwriter and musician
Tomasz "The Polish Hammer" Bonin, Polish heavyweight boxer
Viktor Bonin (1918-1993), Soviet soldiers during World War II, Hero of the Soviet Union
William Bonin (1947–1996), American serial murderer
Pierre-Cédric Bonin (died 2009), French co-pilot on Air France Flight 447

See also
von Bonin